3-Bekat is a station of the Tashkent Metro on Chilonzor Line. It was put into operation on December 26, 2020, as part of the third section of the Chilanzar line, between Olmazor and 5-Bekat. The station is located between 2-Bekat and 4-Bekat.

The planned name for the station was Sirgʻali, which is the name of the city quarter close to the station, however, the station was opened as 3-Bekat, which simply means Station-3.

References

Tashkent Metro stations
Railway stations opened in 2020